SubHuman is the sixth studio album by Recoil. Alan Wilder stated in a  YouTube greeting that there would be a new album coming in spring or early summer 2007.  On 23 April 2007, he released information regarding the album via Myspace and his official website, Shunt. subHuman was released on 9 July 2007 in Europe (14 August 2007 in the US). It has been released on various formats including standard CD, gatefold vinyl and a special CD/DVD edition which includes stereo, 5.1 surround and exclusive "ambient" mixes. The DVD included all the music videos made at the time of release.

Working with Wilder on this album was New Orleans native bluesman Joe Richardson, who contributed vocals, guitar, and harmonica.  Also working on subHuman was his wife and assistant, Hepzibah Sessa, and Paul Kendall, who worked on the album Liquid of 2000 and mixes from the 1997 Unsound Methods album. Another contributor was English singer Carla Trevaskis, who has worked with Fred de Faye (Eurythmics), Cliff Hewitt (Apollo 440) and Dave McDonald (Portishead).

The track "99 to Life" refers to the maximum jail sentence handed out, short of the death penalty. This is based on a real story according to Richardson in an interview with the industrial music magazine Side-Line.

Track listing

CD: Mute / CD STUMM 279 (United Kingdom)

CD/DVD: Mute / LCD STUMM 279 (United Kingdom) 

Includes CD album as above plus a DVD featuring:
High-quality 24-bit and 48 kHz recording of subHuman
5.1 DTS and AC3 surround sound versions of subHuman
Exclusive ambient re-working (reduction mix) of subHuman also in 24-bit/48 kHz quality
Music promo videos:
"Faith Healer"
"Drifting"
"Stalker"
"Strange Hours"
"Jezebel"
"Shunt" (hidden video)
"Electro Blues For Bukka White (2000 Mix)" (hidden video)

Credits and personnel
Alan Wilder – All music
Joe Richardson – Lead Vocal on tracks 1,3,4,6 & 7. Guitars & Harmonica.
Carla Trevaskis – Lead Vocal on tracks 2 & 5.
John Wolfe – Bass Guitar
Richard Lamm – drums
Hepzibah Sessa – Violin and Viola
Lee Funnell – Photography
Jesse Holborn at Design Holborn – Art Direction & Design
Texas Treefort Studios - Recording complex, Austin Texas

Singles

"Prey"
25 June 2007

7": Mute / MUTE 372 (UK) 
"Prey" – single version edit (5:56)
"Prey" – reduction edit

Download: Mute / iMUTE 372 (UK) 
"Prey" – single version edit (5:56)

Download: Mute / LiMute 372 (UK) 
"Prey" [single version] (5:56)
"Prey" [radio edit] (3:56)
"Prey" [reduction] (6:11)
"Prey" (8:03)

Free download 
8 December 2008
"Prey" [shotgun mix]

"The Killing Ground"

Free download 
1 October 2007
"The Killing Ground" [The Slips RMX]

"Prey/Allelujah"
25 February 2008

Limited edition enhanced CD single: Mute / MUTE 372 (UK) 
"Prey" – [radio edit]
"Prey" - [album version]
"Allelujah" [reduction]
"Allelujah" [film video]

References

2007 albums
Mute Records albums
Recoil (band) albums